Lamu West Constituency is an electoral constituency in Kenya. It is one of two constituencies in Lamu County. The constituency has eleven wards, all electing MCAs for the Lamu County Assembly.

Members of Parliament

Locations and wards

References

External links 
Map of the constituency

Constituencies in Lamu County
Constituencies in Coast Province